The David Cohen House is a home in Savannah, Georgia, United States. It is located at 108 East Jones Street and was constructed in 1853.

The building is part of the Savannah Historic District, and in a survey for the Historic Savannah Foundation, Mary Lane Morrison found the building to be of significant status.

It was built for David Lopez Cohen (1820–1893), a successful ship builder from Charleston, South Carolina, and the nephew of David L. Lopez. He also built the Shearith Israel Synagogue at 34 Wentworth Street in Charleston. He is interred in Laurel Grove Cemetery.

See also
Buildings in Savannah Historic District

References

Houses in Savannah, Georgia
Houses completed in 1853
Savannah Historic District